New York's 39th congressional district was a congressional district for the United States House of Representatives in New York. It was created in 1913 as a result of the 1910 U.S. Census. It was eliminated in 1983 as a result of the redistricting cycle after the 1980 Census. It was last represented by Stanley N. Lundine who was redistricted into the 34th congressional district.

Components
1973–1983:
All of Allegany County, Cattaraugus County and Chautauqua County
Parts of Chemung County, Erie County and Steuben County
1963–1973:
Parts of Erie County
1953–1963:
All of Genesee County, Orleans County and Wyoming County
Parts of Monroe County
1945–1953:
All of Chemung County, Schuyler County, Steuben County, Tioga County and Tompkins County
1913–1945:
All of Genesee County, Livingston County, Orleans County and Wyoming County
Parts of Monroe County

List of members representing the district

Election results
The following chart shows historic election results. Bold type indicates victor. Italic type indicates incumbent.

References 

 Congressional Biographical Directory of the United States 1774–present
 Election Statistics 1920-present Clerk of the House of Representatives

39
Former congressional districts of the United States
1913 establishments in New York (state)
1983 disestablishments in New York (state)
Constituencies established in 1913
Constituencies disestablished in 1983